Wally Gray (12 December 1909 – 17 July 1950) was  a former Australian rules footballer who played with Richmond and Fitzroy in the Victorian Football League (VFL).

Notes

External links 
		

1909 births
1950 deaths
Australian rules footballers from Victoria (Australia)
Richmond Football Club players
Fitzroy Football Club players
Preston Football Club (VFA) players